This is a list of programs broadcast by TV One. This list is current as of January 2022.

Current programming

Original programming
Asking for a Friend
ATL Homicide
Fatal Attraction
Fatal Attraction: Last Words
For My Man
Payback
Rickey Smiley For Real
Uncensored
Unsung
Unsung Hollywood

Syndicated reruns
A Different World
The Cosby Show
Family Matters
For Your Love'Living SingleSanford and Son What's Happening!!Good TimesUpcoming programming
Former programming
Original programmingAmerica's Black ForumBaisden After DarkBelle'sBill Bellamy's Who's Got Jokes? Born Again VirginCelebrity Crime FilesDeceivedDivine Restoration The D.L. Hughley ShowDonnie After DarkFind Our MissingFor My WomanG. Garvin: The Road TourGet the Hook Up Here We Go AgainHollywood DivasI Married a BallerJustice By Any MeansLife AfterMakeover ManorThe MannsMy Momma Throws DownR&B Divas: AtlantaR&B Divas: Los Angeles The Rickey Smiley ShowSingletary SaysSister CircleThe Game of DatingThe Next :15The Ultimate MergerThou Shalt NotTrue Hollywood StoriesTurn Up the Heat with G. Garvin Verses and Flow We're the CampbellsAcquired programming227All About the AndersonsAll of Us AmenThe Bernie Mac ShowBetween BrothersBoston PublicCedric the Entertainer PresentsCity of AngelsThe Cosby MysteriesDivorce Court  EmpireEve Everybody Hates Chris           FastlaneThe Flip Wilson ShowGirlfriendsGood News Good TimesHalf & HalfHangin' with Mr. CooperHawthoRNeThe HughleysIn Living ColorIn the HouseI’ll Fly AwayThe Jeffersons Judge KarenLike FamilyLove That Girl!A Man Called HawkMartinMinor AdjustmentsNew York Undercover One on OneOn Our OwnThe Parent 'HoodThe ParkersThe PJsRocShowtime at the ApolloStarting OverThat's My MamaUnder One Roof Wanda at LargeWhat's Happening!!What's Happening Now!!Where I LiveNews and information programmingBlack Enterprise Business ReportNews One NowOur World with Black Enterprise''

References

Lists of television series by network